Cho Hyun-joon (조현준; born January 16, 1968) is a South Korean businessman and has been the Chairman of Hyosung Group since 2017.

Early life 
Born in Seoul in 1968, Cho married Lee Mi-Kyung who is third daughter of Lee Hee-sang, a member of the Dong-Awon Group in 2001. They have three children, Cho In-Young, Cho In-Seo and Cho Jae-Hyun.

Promotion to Chairman 
On December 29, 2016, Cho Hyun-joon took office as chairman.

Educational Background 
He graduated from Posung Middle School in 1983 and Saint Paul's School in the U.S. in 1987. In 1991, he studied in the School of Political Science at Yale University and graduated with a master's degree at Keio University, Graduate School of Law in Japan in 1996.

Career 
In 1992, he joined Mitsubishi Corporation in Tokyo, Japan as a new employee and worked for the Energy Department and the Oil Import Department. In 1995, he worked at Morgan Stanley Tokyo branch at the Corporate Sales Department. In 1997, he joined Hyosung T & C (now Hyosung) as the manager of the management planning team and engaged in the merger of Hyosung T & C, Hyosung Products, Hyosung Life Industry, and Hyosung Heavy Industries. He was promoted to Managing Director in 2000, Executive Director in 2001 and to Vice President in 2003. He served as the Chief of Hyosung Trade PG in 2005, Hyosung Chief of Textile PG and President of Trade PG in 2007 while in 2011 he was Hyosung Chief of Textile and President of IT PG and Strategy HQ. He was inaugurated as the Chairman of Hyosung Group in 2017.

Personal life 
Cho is fluent in a variety of foreign languages such as English, Japanese, and Italian, and is interested in various fields such as politics, culture, and society. He has been acquainted with young leaders of the United States, Japan and China.

References 

1968 births
Living people
South Korean chief executives
Yale Graduate School of Arts and Sciences alumni
Keio University alumni